Lawrence Everhart (6 May 1755 – 1840) was a soldier in the American Revolutionary War. He served for the duration of the conflict and is credited with saving the life of Col. William Washington (a cousin of then General George Washington).

Background
Everhart's parents, Christian Everhart and Maria Sybilla Geier Everhart were German immigrants.  Their oldest son was Lawrence Everhart, born on May 6, 1755, in Frederick County, Maryland. (Note: His birth location so recorded by Lawrence Everhart in the Federal Government Pension papers of April 7, 1834.)

Service in the Revolutionary War
Following the Declaration of Independence, Everhart enlisted with the militia, The Flying Camp, headed by Capt. Jacob Goode as a private on August 1, 1776, at Taneytown, Maryland.  The next day the company marched to Annapolis, Maryland and then to Philadelphia, Pennsylvania for training.  Lawrence was then reassigned to General Beall in New York.  His first battle was at White Plains, New York.  The battle resulted in a disastrous defeat for the American forces.

Everhart's company retreated to Ft. Washington, but after reaching the Fort,  Lawrence was taken prisoner along with the other troops.  He, along with several others, later escaped from the British guards and fled to Ft. Lee.  After Ft. Lee he was transferred to Hackensack, New Jersey.  There he met with General George Washington.  The General was extremely upset with the lack of trained soldiers and supplies provided by the Continental Congress and Everhart later remembered that "Washington was to the point of tears".

Everhart was discharged from The Flying Camp in 1777 because he had served his required enlisted time.  But he returned to regiment and remained with the officers to give assistance to them.  He returned to his home in [Frederick County, Maryland] during harvest time of 1778.
He reenlisted at the rank of sergeant under Captain Swan with the cavalry regiment commanded by Lieutenant Colonel William Washington in Fredericktown, Maryland.  In March 1779, his regiment marched through Fredericksburg to Petersburg with Lt. Col. Washington.  During this time, he served as aide to Col. Washington.  In April 1780, his cavalry regiment was stationed in Charlestown, South Carolina.  His regiment engaged in skirmishes with the British led by Lieutenant Colonel Banastre Tarleton at Stony Church, Monks Corner, and Rugley's Mill.

Ongoing skirmishes between Lt. Col. Tarleton and American General Daniel Morgan's patriot forces finally culminated in the Battle of Cowpens.  Everhart was wounded in the battle and taken prisoner by British forces.  As a captive, Everhart famously expressed his wish to a nearby officer that he "hoped to God that it would be another Tarleton defeat".  The British officer replied, " I am Colonel Tarleton, Sir!"  And his retort being, "and I am Sgt. Everhart!"

The conditions regarding Everhart's release either by escape or prisoner exchange remain obscure.  However, it is known that he went on to Guliford Courthouse for medical care.  Everhart was later sent to Yorktown, Virginia and had the opportunity to meet the Marquis de Lafayette.

Everhart returned to his family home in Middletown, Maryland at the end of October.  Within the next month he received a letter from Colonel Bayler to return to his former regiment to assist Bayler at Petersburg, Virginia.  Before leaving he married Mary Anna Beckenbaugh, in Middletown, Maryland.

Life After the War
Following his service in the war, he became ordained as a minister in the Methodist church. In 1833, Rev. Everhart retired to his home near Middletown, Maryland where he resided until his death in 1840... CAN I GET A HOOYAA

1755 births
1840 deaths
Continental Army soldiers
American people of German descent
Maryland militiamen in the American Revolution
People of colonial Maryland
People of Maryland in the American Revolution